The Patrick Hughes House, also known as Hughes Ranch and the Historic Hughes House, is a historic Queen Anne-style house built in 1898 on Cape Blanco in the U.S. state of Oregon.

It is now operated as a historic house museum by the Cape Blanco Heritage Society.

The house was added to the National Register of Historic Places in 1980.

References

External links 
 Hughes Ranch - Cape Blanco Heritage Society
 Historic Hughes House - Port Orford tourism site

Houses on the National Register of Historic Places in Oregon
National Register of Historic Places in Curry County, Oregon
Museums in Curry County, Oregon
Historic house museums in Oregon
1898 establishments in Oregon